The men's team Nordic combined competition for the 1998 Winter Olympics in Nagano was held at Hakuba Ski Jumping Stadium and Snow Harp on 19 and 20 February. For the first time, the Olympic team Nordic combined event featured a 4 x 5 kilometre relay race, rather than the 3 x 10 km used previously.

Results

Ski jumping
Each of the four team members performed a single jump that was judged in the same format as the Olympic ski jumping competition. The scores for all the jumps each team were combined and used to calculate their deficit in the cross-country skiing portion of the event. Each point difference between teams in the ski jumping portion in this event resulted in a three second difference in the cross country part of the event.

Cross-country

Each member of the team completed a five kilometre cross-country skiing leg.

References

Nordic combined at the 1998 Winter Olympics